"Trouble" is the debut solo single by Lindsey Buckingham, released in 1981 from his debut solo album Law and Order. The single was Buckingham's first hit as a solo artist, peaking at number nine in the US and number 31 in the UK, where it remained charted for seven weeks. In Australia, it topped the chart for three weeks and became the eighth biggest-selling single of 1982. It experienced similar levels of success in South Africa, reaching number one for two weeks and finishing 1982 as the country's 13th best-selling single.

Background
"Trouble" was the only track on Law and Order on which Buckingham played neither bass or drums. Buckingham approached "Trouble" differently from his other songs, wanting the song to have more of a "live feel" and recruited his Fleetwood Mac bandmate, Mick Fleetwood, to play drums. However, Buckingham believed none of the takes were satisfactory from start to finish, so a taped loop of the drum track (about four seconds long) was used throughout the song: "The irony of that was that the original reason for having Mick play on the song was to approach the track completely live, as opposed to my usual technique." Buckingham would later overdub some additional drum fills and cymbal crashes, in addition to other percussion instruments, creating the illusion of live drums.

George Hawkins, who had worked with Fleetwood on The Visitor earlier that year, was brought in to play bass guitar.  Buckingham recorded some half-speed guitars for the choruses along with a Spanish influenced guitar solo, the latter of which he was particularly proud of. Some of Buckingham's vocals for the song are sung in falsetto.

Record World said that the sound is "simply dazzling."

Music video
The distinctive music video for "Trouble" features a multi-instrumental "big band" consisting of male musicians—four as guitarists and two bassists, besides Buckingham, and six as drummers, including Mick Fleetwood. Walter Egan also appears in the music video as the second guitarist from the front. The video also features ex-Fleetwood Mac guitarists Bob Welch, who appears in the music video as the third guitarist from the front, and Bob Weston, as well as Dwight Twilley, who appears in the music video as the second guitarist from the back, and Andy Ward (the drummer from Camel). 

The video received regular airplay on MTV during late 1981 and early 1982.

Track listings

7": Asylum Records / E-47223 (US)
A   "Trouble" – 3:45
B   "Mary Lee Jones" – 3:12

7": Mercury / 6000 743 (Australia)
A   "Trouble" – 3:56
B   "That's How We Do It in L.A." – 2:52

Personnel
Lindsey Buckingham – vocals, guitars, electric piano, drum overdubs and percussions 
George Hawkins – bass
Mick Fleetwood – drums

Charts

Weekly charts

Year-end charts

Certifications and sales

In other media
 The song is heard in the film Just One of the Guys during the blind date.
 Metavari recorded a cover version of "Trouble" for their 2017 Record Store Day release, Metropolis (An Original Re-Score by Metavari), on One Way Static Records and distributed in the United States by Light in the Attic Records.

References

1981 songs
1981 debut singles
Lindsey Buckingham songs
Songs written by Lindsey Buckingham
Number-one singles in Australia
Song recordings produced by Richard Dashut
Asylum Records singles
Number-one singles in South Africa